Club Brugge K.V. won the title of the 1991–92 season.

Relegated teams

These teams were relegated to the second division at the end of the season:
K.V. Kortrijk
Eendracht Aalst

Final league table

Results

Top goal scorers

References

Belgian Pro League seasons
Belgian
1991–92 in Belgian football